The following is a list of people executed by the U.S. state of South Dakota from 1877 to date. A total of 20 people have been executed in South Dakota since 1877. Prior to 1915, the sole method of execution was via hanging. South Dakota banned the death penalty in 1915, but it was reinstated in 1939. The method of execution was then changed to electrocution.

Capital punishment was reinstated in South Dakota in 1979 following the U.S. Supreme Court decision of Gregg v. Georgia. The method of execution was changed from electrocution to lethal injection in 1984. Since 1979, a total of 5 people have been executed, all by lethal injection.

See also 
 Capital punishment in South Dakota
 Capital punishment in the United States

Notes 


References 

 
South Dakota
Executed